Edmund Gonville (died 1351) founded Gonville Hall in 1348, which later was re-founded by John Caius to become Gonville and Caius College. Gonville Hall was his third foundation. Before this he had founded two religious houses, a College at Rushford, Norfolk, 1342 (suppressed in 1541) and the Hospital of St John at Bishop's Lynn, Norfolk. The origin of his wealth is obscure.

His father was William Gonville, a Frenchman domiciled in England, who owned the Manor of Lerling and other property in Norfolk. William's eldest son was Sir Nicholas Gonville who married an heiress of the Lerling family.

Gonville worked for King Edward III of England, including lending him money. In return he was rewarded with appointment as King's clerk (a title later known as Secretary of State). After Gonville, supported by Sir Walter Manny, petitioned Edward III for permission to set up a college for 20 scholars at the University of Cambridge, permission was granted and Edward III issued Letters patent in January 1348.

Offices held

References
Notes

Bibliography
C. N. L. Brooke, ‘Gonville , Edmund (d. 1351)’, Oxford Dictionary of National Biography, Oxford University Press, 2004, accessed 8 Sept 2008

External links 
 Edmund Gonville from the website of Gonville and Caius College, Cambridge

Founders of English schools and colleges
Founders of Gonville and Caius College, Cambridge
1351 deaths
Year of birth unknown